The following are lists of the highest-grossing films and domestic films in Taiwan, by their total gross in Taiwan (in New Taiwan dollar).

Top-grossing films

Top-grossing domestic films

See also
Cinema of Taiwan
List of highest-grossing films

References

Taiwan
Highest-grossing